The Gandhigram Rural University (GRI) is a centrally-funded Deemed University based on Dindigul in Tamil Nadu, India.

History
Dr. T.S. Soundaram and Dr. G. Ramachandran developed the institute. The Gandhigram Rural Institute  of Higher Education was founded in 1956 to carry on Mahatma Gandhi’s ‘Nai Talim’ system of education. In 1976 it was declared as Deemed University, by University Grants Commission (UGC), New Delhi, Under Section 3 of UGC Act 1956. It is fully funded by UGC.

In 2006 it was renamed Gandhigram Rural Institute as per the guidelines of UGC.

With devotion to Mahatma Gandhi's revolutionary concept of ‘Nai Talim’ system of education, Gandhigram Rural Institute has developed academic programmes in Rural Development, Rural Economics and Extension Education, Rural Oriented Sciences, Cooperation, Development Administration, Rural Sociology, English and Foreign Languages, and, Tamil and Indian Languages.

The institute has developed into a major educational complex, comprising seven faculties, offering in 50 programmes. It awards Doctoral, Master's and Bachelor’s degrees, diplomas, and certificates through its seven academic faculties: Rural Development, Rural Social Sciences, Rural Oriented Sciences, English and Foreign Languages, Tamil, Indian Languages and Rural Arts, Rural Health and Sanitation, and, Agriculture and Animal Husbandry.

It has 3000 students and 150 teaching and 250 non-teaching staff.

The institute was accredited with Five Star status by NAAC, in February 2002. It was re-accredited with A grade in 2010.

Recently, It named as Gandhigram Rural Institute (Deemed to be University)

Campus
To its west are chains of mountains including the Kodaikanal Hill Station. Lying north of Madurai, Gandhigram is easily accessible by rail and road. The climate is hot throughout the year.

Notable alumni
 K. R. Meera, Indian Writer 
 Raghavan (actor), Malayalam film industry

Transport 
The nearest railway station is Ambathurai, the nearest major railway junction is Dindigul and the nearest major city is Madurai. The nearest airport is Madurai Airport.

Rankings

Gandhigram Rural Institute was ranked 91
0 among universities in India by the National Institutional Ranking Framework (NIRF) in 2021 and in the 101–150 band overall.

Former Chancellors 

 P. B. Gajendragadkar, seventh Chief Justice of India
 T. S. Soundram, Indian physician and politician
 R. Venkatraman, eighth President of India
 Shankar Dayal Sharma, eighth Vice President of India
 K.R. Narayanan, tenth President of India
 Krishan Kant, tenth Vice President of India
 Bhairon Singh Shekhawat, eleventh Vice President of India
 Mohammad Hamid Ansari, twelfth Vice President of India
 Renana Jhabvala, social worker in India

Former Vice Chancellors 

 G. Ramachandran, social reformer
 M. Aram, educator and peace activist
 Devendra Kumar
 D. K. Oza
 T. R. Natesan
 N. Markandan
 G. Pankajam
 T. Karunakaran
 Sm. Ramasamy

References

External links 
 

Gandhigram Rural Institute
Education in Dindigul district
Educational institutions established in 1956
1956 establishments in Madras State